The 1958 United States Senate election in Montana took place on November 4, 1958. Incumbent United States Senator Mike Mansfield, who was first elected to the Senate in 1952, ran for re-election. Mansfield won the Democratic primary comfortably, and moved on to the general election, where he was opposed by Lou W. Welch, a millworker and the Republican nominee. In contrast to the close campaign in 1952, Mansfield defeated Welch in a landslide and won his second term in the Senate easily.

Democratic primary

Candidates
Mike Mansfield, incumbent United States Senator
J. M. Nickey
Thomas G. Stimatz, former State Representative

Results

Republican primary

Candidates
Lou W. Welch, millworker
Blanche Anderson

Results

General election

Results

See also 
 1958 United States Senate elections

References

Montana
1958
1958 Montana elections